Lețcani is a commune in Iași County, Western Moldavia, Romania, part of the Iași metropolitan area. It is composed of four villages: Bogonos, Cogeasca, Cucuteni and Lețcani.

Among historians and archaeologists, Lețcani is famous as the place where one of the very few known Gothic runic inscriptions was found, on a spindle whorl dated to the 4th century.

References

Communes in Iași County
Localities in Western Moldavia